Rottenberg is a surname. Notable people with the surname include:

Anda Rottenberg (born 1944), Polish art historian, art critic and writer
Dan Rottenberg (born 1942), American writer, editor and journalist
Dorian Rottenberg, translator
Ena Rottenberg, (1893–1952), Hungarian-Austrian craftswoman, draftswoman and ceramist
Enrique Rottenberg (born 1948), Israeli artist
Felix Rottenberg (born 1957), Dutch politician
Linda Rottenberg, American businesswoman and writer
Ludwig Rottenberg (1865–1932), Austrian-German composer and conductor
Mika Rottenberg (born 1976), Israeli artist
Silke Rottenberg (born 1972), German women's footballer